Mr. Vampire 1992, also known as Chinese Vampire Story, is a 1992 Hong Kong comedy horror film directed by Ricky Lau. The film is the fifth of a series of five jiangshi films directed by Ricky Lau in the Mr. Vampire franchise. The Chinese title of the film literally translates to New Mr. Vampire.

Mr. Vampire 1992 is considered to be the true sequel to the original 1985 Mr. Vampire, as the main cast (Lam Ching-ying, Ricky Hui and Chin Siu-ho) in the first film reprised their roles. Mr. Vampire 1992 is also set directly after the events in Mr. Vampire, with some references to the first film, such as Man-choi commenting on how he felt after being infected with the "hopping corpse virus". New characters were introduced in Mr. Vampire 1992, and some actors from the first film, such as Billy Lau, were recast in new roles.

Plot
The film is based on the concept of the souls of aborted fetuses who reside in statues awaiting reincarnation. One of these is a particularly nasty soul who possesses a nanny who in turn sets to work to find the suitable host pregnant lady which turns out to be Priest Kau's childhood sweetheart, Mai Kei-lin.

The other storyline involves a General (who is married to the aforementioned Mai) who was infected by the vampire virus from his dead father and seeks Kau's help in healing him. This involves grinding the fangs of his vampiric father to make the antidote. After failing in the task, Kau's disciples are sent to hunt out a group of vampires to obtain their fangs.

Both storylines converge at the finale with the demon child taking full possession of Mei and the group of vampires seeking revenge in a final all-out battle at the General's residence.

Cast
Lam Ching-ying as Master Kau (九叔)
Ricky Hui as Man-choi (文才)
Chin Siu-ho as Chau-sang (秋生)
Sandra Ng as Kwan-yue
Billy Lau as the General
Suki Kwan as Mai Kei-lin (米淇蓮)
Tam Hoi-yan as Mai Nim-ying
Tsui Man-wah as Mai Kei-lin's nanny
Yu Mo-lin as the female jiangshi
Si Gai-keung as Darn
Goo Wai-jan as Wai-heung
Lee Hin-ming as Wai-heung's husband
Tse Wai-kit as Kiu
Lee Chi-git as a jiangshi victim
Bowie Lam
Michael Chan

Guest stars
Yip Wing-cho as the General's sushi chef
Siu Yam-yam as the retarded boy's mother

External links
 
 
 Mr. Vampire 1992 at Hong Kong Cinemagic

1992 films
1990s comedy horror films
1992 action comedy films
1992 martial arts films
Hong Kong horror films
Hong Kong action comedy films
Hong Kong martial arts films
Jiangshi films
Martial arts horror films
Martial arts comedy films
Mr. Vampire
Vampire comedy films
Hong Kong sequel films
1990s Hong Kong films